Aman Kumar (born 18 December 1999) is an Indian cricketer. He made his List A debut for Haryana in the 2017–18 Vijay Hazare Trophy on 14 February 2018. He made his first-class debut on 9 December 2019, for Haryana in the 2019–20 Ranji Trophy.

References

External links
 

1999 births
Living people
Indian cricketers
Haryana cricketers
Place of birth missing (living people)